Harold Williamson  may refer to

 Harold Williamson (journalist) (1922–2001), British journalist
 Harold F. Williamson (1901–1989), American business historian
 Harold Sandys Williamson (1892–1978), British artist
Harold Williamson (British artist) (1898–1972)

See also
 Williamson (surname)